Carlia johnstonei, the rough brown rainbow-skink, is a species of skink in the genus Carlia. It is endemic to Western Australia.

References

Carlia
Reptiles described in 1974
Endemic fauna of Australia
Skinks of Australia
Taxa named by Glen Milton Storr